Karantaba Tenda  is a small town in north-eastern Gambia. It is located in Sami District in the Central River Division.  As of 2009, it has an estimated population of 1922.

References

Populated places in the Gambia
Central River Division